Arturo Osuna Ordoñez (born 22 May 1997) is a Spanish footballer who plays as a defender for Pittsburgh Riverhounds in the USL Championship.

Career
Ordoñez played with the academy teams at Pobla de Mafumet and Gimnàstic. He went on to play with Pobla de Mafumet in the Tercera División, including a loan spell with Castelldefels.

In 2019, Ordoñez moved to the United States to play college soccer at the University of Pittsburgh.  He went on to make 57 appearances for the Panthers during his time there, scoring six goals and tallying four assists. During his time at college, he was a two-time All-ACC Academic Team, two-time All-ACC Tournament Team, All-ACC Freshman Team, All-ACC Third Team and All-ACC Second Team.

On 11 January 2022, Ordoñez was selected 39th overall in the 2022 MLS SuperDraft by Houston Dynamo. However, he was not signed by the club.

On 17 February 2022, Ordoñez signed with USL Championship club Pittsburgh Riverhounds. He made his debut for the Riverhounds on 12 March 2022, starting in a 3–0 win over Memphis 901.

References

External links
Riverhounds bio
Pitt bio

1997 births
Living people
Association football defenders
CF Pobla de Mafumet footballers
Expatriate soccer players in the United States
Houston Dynamo FC draft picks
Pittsburgh Panthers men's soccer players
Pittsburgh Riverhounds SC players
Spanish expatriate footballers
Spanish expatriate sportspeople in the United States
Spanish footballers
Tercera División players
USL Championship players